Aprominta yatagan is a moth in the family Autostichidae.  It was described by László Anthony Gozmány in 2008.  It is found in Asia Minor.

References

Moths described in 2008
Aprominta
Moths of Asia